Anthoupolis is a district of the Municipality of Kato Polemidia.

Location 
To the east  Anthroupolis district  borders with the Apostle Varnavas, to the north with Agios Nikolaos, to the west with Ypsonas and to the south with the Archangel Michael.

Area Map

References

Populated places in Limassol District
Subdivisions of Cyprus